Paiwan is a native language of Taiwan, spoken by the Paiwan, a Taiwanese indigenous people. Paiwan is a Formosan language of the Austronesian language family. It is also one of the national languages of Taiwan.

Dialects
Paiwan variants are seen divided into the following dialect zones by(Ferrell 1982:4–6).

A1 – southern and central
Kuɬaɬau (Kulalao) – used in Ferrell's 1982 Paiwan Dictionary due to its widespread intelligibility and preservation of various phonemic distinctions; also spoken in Tjuabar Village, Taitung County, where Tjariḍik and "Tjuabar" (closely related to Tjavuaɬi) are also spoken.
Kapaiwanan (Su-Paiwan)
Tjuaqatsiɬay (Kachirai) – southernmost dialect
A2 – central
ɬarəkrək (Riki-riki)
Patjavaɬ (Ta-niao-wan)
B1 – northernmost
Tjukuvuɬ (Tokubun)
Kaviangan (Kapiyan)
B2 – northwestern
Tjaɬakavus (Chalaabus, Lai-yi)
Makazayazaya (Ma-chia)
B3 – east-central
Tjariḍik (Charilik)
B4 – eastern
Tjavuaɬi (Taimali)
Tjakuvukuvuɬ (Naibon, Chaoboobol)

This classification were though be corrected by Cheng 2016 as below:
Note: A village unnoted of Vuculj/Ravar is by default placed under Vuculj here.

Phonology
Unlike many other Formosan languages that have merged many Proto-Austronesian phonemes, Paiwan preserves most Proto-Austronesian phonemes and is thus highly important for reconstruction purposes.

In Northern Paiwan the palatal consonants have been lost, though this is recent and a few conservative speakers maintain them as allophonic variants (not as distinct phonemes).  is robust, unlike in other Paiwan dialects where its status is uncertain, as it derives from *q.

Fricative  is characteristic of Mudan village; elsewhere is Southern Paiwan it tends to be a trill , though it still varies . Word-initial *k has become .

Grammar

Pronouns
The Paiwan personal pronouns below are from Ferrell (1982:14).

Function words
Paiwan has three construction markers, which are also known as relational particles (Ferrell 1982:13).

a – shows equational relationship; personal sing. = ti, personal plural = tia
nua – shows genitive / partitive relationship; personal sing. = ni, personal plural = nia
tua – shows that the relationship is neither equational nor genitive; personal sing. = *, personal plural = 

Other words include:
i – be at, in (place)
nu – if when
na – already (definitely) done/doing or have become
uri – definite future negative marker
uri – definite future marker
ɬa – emphasis, setting apart

Affixed adverbials include (Ferrell 1982:14):

: tomorrow
: yesterday

: soon, in a little while (future)
: a little while ago

: when? (future)
: when? (past)

Interjections include (Ferrell 1982:12):
ui – yes
ini- no (not do)
neka – no, not (not exist)
ai – oh! (surprise, wonder)
ai ḍivá – alas!
uá – oh! (surprise, taken aback)
ai ḍaḍá – ouch! (pain)

Verbs
Paiwan verbs have 4 types of focus (Ferrell 1982:30).

Agent/Actor
Object/Goal/Patient
Referent: spatial/temporal locus, indirect object, beneficiary
Instrument/Cause/Motivation/Origin

The following verbal affixes are used to express varying degrees of volition or intent, and are arranged below from highest to lowest intention (Ferrell 1982:37).

ki- (intentional)
pa- (intentional)
-m- (volitionally ambiguous)
si- (volitionally ambiguous)
ma- (non-intentional)
se- (non-intentional)

Paiwan verbs can also take on the following non-derivational suffixes (Ferrell 1982:13).
-anga: "certainly," "truly doing"
-angata: "definitely" (emphatic)
-anga: "still, yet, continuing to"

Affixes
The Paiwan affixes below are from the Kulalao dialect unless stated otherwise, and are sourced from Ferrell (1982:15–27).

Prefixes
: used as an inchoative marker with some stems; past marker
: principal, main
: time/place characterized by something
: go past, via; having finished
: go/cause to go by way of (something/place)
: come from
: eat, drink, consume
: get, obtain
: my; I (as agent of non-agent focus verb)
: belonging to a given [plant/animal] category
: to go in the direction of
: (have) come to be in/at
: have quality of
: be affected by, be in condition of (involuntary)
: having reciprocal relationship
: in some general category
: number of persons
: agent marker usually involving change of status (used with certain verbs)
: be gigantic, super-
: agent marker that is usually intransitive (used with certain verbs)
: pretend, claim
: agent marker (certain verbs)
: every
: to cause to be/occur
: emerge, come into view
: put in/on; do something to
: have or produce; acquire
: place where something is put or kept
: do nothing except ...
: having to do with
: do at/during
: do at/in
: wish to; go to, in direction of; have odor, quality, flavor of
: transfer something to; nearly, be on point of doing
: use, utilize, employ
: perhaps, most likely is
: construct, work on/in
: become/act as; one who acts as
: do frequently/habitually; have many of
: people of (village/nation); have quality of; occur suddenly/unexpectedly/unintentionally
: be in state/condition of (involuntary)
: be instrument/cause/beneficiary of; instrument focus marker; belonging to certain time in past
: carry, transport
: your; you (agent of non-agent focus verb); leave, remove, desist from
: remove or have removed from oneself
: past marker
: similar to, like
: be dissimilar but of same size
: our, we (inclusive); more, to a greater extent, further
: take along for use
: most, -est
: be definitely
: reach/extend as far as
: furthest, utmost
: to have just done
: choose to do at/from
: containing
: used mainly in plant/animal species names (non-Kulalao frozen affix)
: be/remain at
: do/use separately; be/do at certain place
: search for

Infixes
-aɬ-, -al-, -ar-: having sound or quality of; involving use of; non-Kulalao
-ar-: do indiscriminately, on all sides; non-Kulalao
-m-: agent or actor; -n- following /p/, /b/, /v/, /m/; m- before vowel-initial words
-in-: perfective marker, action already begun or accomplished, object or product of past action; in- before vowel-initial words

Suffixes
-an: specific location in time/space; specific one/type; referent focus
-en: object/goal of action; object focus
-aw, -ay: projected or intended action, referent focus
-u: agent focus (most subordinate clauses); most peremptory imperative
-i: object focus (most subordinate clauses); polite imperative
-ɬ: things in sequence; groupings; durations of time

The following affixes are from the Tjuabar dialect of Paiwan, spoken in the northwest areas of Paiwan-occupied territory (Comparative Austronesian Dictionary 1995).

Nouns
-aḷ-, -aly- 'tiny things'
-in- 'things made from plant roots'
-an 'place' (always used with another affix)
mar(ə)- 'a pair of' (used for humans only)
pu- 'rich'
ḳay- 'vegetation'
sə- 'inhabitants'
cua- 'name of a tribe'

Verbs
-aŋa 'already done'
ka- 'to complete'
kə- 'to do something oneself'
ki- 'to do something to oneself'
kisu- 'to get rid of'
kicu- 'to do something separately'
maCa- 'to do something reciprocally' (where C indicates the initial consonant of the stem)
mə- 'to experience, to be something'
pa- 'to cause someone to do something'
pu- 'to produce, to get something'
sa- 'to be willing to do something'
calyu- 'to arrive at'

Adjectives
ma- 'being'
na- 'with the quality of'
səcalyi- 'very'
ca- 'more than'

Notes

References

External links
 Yuánzhùmínzú yǔyán xiànshàng cídiǎn 原住民族語言線上詞典  – Paiwan search page at the "Aboriginal language online dictionary" website of the Indigenous Languages Research and Development Foundation
 Paiwan teaching and leaning materials published by the Council of Indigenous Peoples of Taiwan  
 Paiwan translation of President Tsai Ing-wen's 2016 apology to indigenous people – published on the website of the presidential office

Languages of Taiwan
Formosan languages